Séamus Bannon (1927 – 27 February 1990) was an Irish sportsman. He played hurling at various with his local clubs Nenagh Éire Óg in Tipperary and Young Irelands in Dublin and was a member of the Tipperary senior inter-county team in the 1940s and 1950s. Bannon won three All-Ireland and three Munster titles with Tipperary.

He was the father of association football player Paul Bannon.

References

1927 births
1990 deaths
Deaths in Wales
Nenagh Éire Óg hurlers
Young Irelands (Dublin) hurlers
Tipperary inter-county hurlers
All-Ireland Senior Hurling Championship winners